The 1913 Southwestern Moundbuilders football team represented Southwestern College in the 1913 college football season. The team won the Kansas State Championship.

Clapp fielded an African American player for his team.  Kansas Normal School (now called Pittsburg State University officially launched a formal protest against the appearance of the player.  In that same game, a player named Fred Hamilton was playing left halfback and was injured to the extent of having a broken neck and paralyzed arms.  The game ended in a 6–6 tie.

References

Southwestern
Southwestern Moundbuilders football seasons
Southwestern Moundbuilders football